Thomas Marshall Sperbeck III (born May 19, 1960) is an American college football coach and former player. Sperbeck was the head football coach at California State University, Sacramento from 2007 to April 2014, resigning in the midst of an NCAA investigation into violations committed under his supervision.

Coaching career
Prior to his tenure at Sacramento State, Sperbeck was head coach for 15 seasons at Foothill College in Los Altos Hills, California, amassing a 109–53 record.

Sperbeck was named the ninth head football coach at Sacramento State on January 13, 2007.  His tenure would end via resignation after the 2013 season.  After Sperbeck's departure, an NCAA investigation found that the Hornets football program has committed several secondary violations during his stint as the team's head coach.

Administrative career
In 2015, Sperbeck became vice president of development at Jesuit High School in Carmichael.

Head coaching record

College

References

External links
 Sacramento State profile

1960 births
Living people
American football quarterbacks
Junior college football coaches in the United States
Nevada Wolf Pack football players
Oregon State Beavers football players
Sacramento State Hornets football coaches
People from Carmichael, California
Players of American football from Sacramento, California